Denis Scanlon (born 5 April 1954) is a former Australian rules footballer who played for Essendon in the Victorian Football League (VFL).

Scanlon won North Hobart's 'best and fairest' award in 1973 and was a member of their 1974 premiership team. Although primarily a defender, Scanlon could also play as a ruckman and he was recruited to Essendon in 1976 for a record high transfer fee. From his debut mid-season, through the rest of the decade, he was a regular fixture in the side and made a finals appearance in 1979. He represented Tasmania at the 1975 Knockout Carnival and 1980 Adelaide State of Origin Carnival.

After completing a doctorate, Scanlon has worked as a medical researcher at the University of Melbourne.

References

Holmesby, Russell and Main, Jim (2007). The Encyclopedia of AFL Footballers. 7th ed. Melbourne: Bas Publishing.

1954 births
Living people
Essendon Football Club players
North Hobart Football Club players
Tasmanian State of Origin players
Australian rules footballers from Tasmania